Hadrianopolis or Adrianopolis ( Hadrianoupolis) may refer to several cities named after Hadrian:

Europe
Hadrianopolis, a former quarter of Athens, Greece; see Arch of Hadrian (Athens)
Hadrianopolis in Epiro, a town and bishopric of ancient Epirus, now Albania
Hadrianopolis in Haemimontus, a former name of Edirne, Turkey
Hadrianopolis (Macedonia), a town of ancient Macedonia, Greece

Asia
Hadrianopolis in Caria or Stratonicea (Caria), a former name of Eskihisar, Turkey
Hadrianopolis in Cilicia, a former name of Mersin, Turkey
Hadrianopolis in Lycia, another name of Olympus (Lycia), Turkey
Hadrianopolis in Lydia or Stratonicea (Lydia), a former name of Siledik, Turkey
Hadrianopolis in Paphlagonia, a town and bishopric of ancient Paphlagonia and later Bithynia, now Turkey
Hadrianopolis in Pisidia, a former name of Şarkikaraağaç, Turkey
Hadrianopolis (Pisidia), a town of ancient Pisidia, now Turkey
Hadrianopolis in Phrygia, a town and bishopric of ancient Phrygia, now Turkey
Hadrianopolis in Pontus, a former name of Amasya, Turkey
Hadrianopolis in Pontus, a former name of Niksar, Turkey
Hadrianopolis in Syria, a former name of Palmyra, Syria

Africa
Hadrianopolis in Africa, a former name of Carthage, Tunisia
Hadrianopolis in Cyrenaica, a former name of Deriana, Libya